Cousances was the brand of enameled cast iron cookware ("cocotte" in French). originally manufactured by a foundry in the town of Cousances-les-Forges in northeastern France.  The Cousances foundry began making cast iron pans in 1553. Four centuries later, in 1957, the brand was acquired by Le Creuset.  Cookware under the Cousances brand continued to be manufactured by Le Creuset into the early 1980s.  

A conspicuous Cousances design was a dutch oven called the Doufeu (literally "gentle fire") in which the sunken or recessed lid was kept at a reduced temperature by placing ice cubes 
on top and allowing the steam inside to condense. As the inside of the lid was dotted with smooth protrusions or notches, the condensed droplets sprinkled back evenly on the cooking food to baste it. 

The Cousances foundry also made cast-iron firebacks, with one example of a design with stamp, "DECOUSANCES" dating to 1690.

See also 

 Descoware
 Druware
 Le Creuset

References

External links
 Description at Le Creuset website

Kitchenware brands
Cooking vessels
Cast iron